The Ivory Coast national beach soccer team represents Ivory Coast in international beach soccer competitions and is controlled by the Ivorian Football Federation, the governing body for football in Ivory Coast.

Current squad
Correct as of September 2013:

Coach: Lohognon Soro

Achievements
 FIFA Beach Soccer World Cup Best: Eleventh place
 2009
 CAF Beach Soccer Championship Best: Runners-up
 2009

References

External links
 Squad

African national beach soccer teams
Beach Soccer